Area code 674 serves several municipalities in the western highlands in the State of Durango. The area code was created in 2002 as a result of the consolidation of location specific area codes 181, 182 and 183. The local area code went from 186 and 187 to 1, at the same time, the local number length increased from 5 to 7 digits. In the process, the area code went from designating a city or town to designating a geographical area. The 674 area code is centered in Santiago Papasquiaro. The original code for the city of Santiago Papasquiaro was 186. A total of 206,286 numbers have been assigned to this area code as of November 2018.

States in the area code: 1

Cities and Towns in the area code: 23

Companies providing phone service in the area code: 28

Local Number: 7 Digits

International dialing: +52 + 674 + 7 digits

Telephone numbers in Mexico
Durango